Mr. Johnson, Your Room is on Fire is a 2005 Andreas Johnson studio album. In 2006, the album was rereleased, including the song "Sing for Me".

Track listing
Fools Like Us
Show Me XXXX
Sunshine of Mine
Caravan
Life Is
How Big Is America
Drop in the Ocean
Not Afraid
Exit New York
What If
Nobody Told Me (Such a Fool)
Still My World

Mr. Johnson, Your Room is on Fire, 2
Sing for Me
Fools Like Us
Show Me XXXX
Sunshine of Mine
Caravan
Life Is
How Big Is America
Drop in the Ocean
Not Afraid
Exit New York
What If
Nobody Told Me (Such a Fool)
Still My World
Sing for Me (acoustic demo version)

Contributors
Andreas Johnson - vocals
Peter Kvint - producer, guitar, bass, keyboard, melodica, pedal steel, vibraphone, organ, percussion
Jerker Odelholm - bass
Johan Lindström - guitar, piano, pedal steel
Andreas Dahlbäck - drums, percussion

Charts

References

External links

2005 albums
Andreas Johnson albums